This is a list of 135 species in Pseudopanurgus, a genus of mining bees in the family Andrenidae.

Pseudopanurgus species

 Pseudopanurgus adjunctus Timberlake, 1975 i c
 Pseudopanurgus aestivalis Provancher, 1882 i c g - summer miner bee
 Pseudopanurgus aethiops Linnaeus, 1758 i c g b
 Pseudopanurgus albitarsis Zetterstedt, 1838 i c g b
 Pseudopanurgus altissimus Cockerell, 1922) i c g
 Pseudopanurgus amplipennis Timberlake, 1975) i c
 Pseudopanurgus andrenoides Spinola, 1808 i c g b - small black miner bee
 Pseudopanurgus arctiventris Timberlake, 1975 i c g
 Pseudopanurgus aristatus Timberlake, 1975 i c g
 Pseudopanurgus arizonicus Timberlake, 1964 i c g
 Pseudopanurgus asperatus Timberlake, 1975 i c g
 Pseudopanurgus atricornis Grote, 1874 i c g b
 Pseudopanurgus aurifodinae Michener, 1937 i c g
 Pseudopanurgus bakeri Cockerell, 1896 i c g
 Pseudopanurgus barberi Cockerell, 1899 i c
 Pseudopanurgus bidentis Cockerell, 1896 i c g
 Pseudopanurgus boylei Cockerell, 1896 i c g
 Pseudopanurgus brevis Timberlake, 1975 i c g
 Pseudopanurgus californicus Cresson, 1878 i c g
 Pseudopanurgus cameroni (Baker, 1906) i c g
 Pseudopanurgus cazieri Timberlake, 1973 i c g
 Pseudopanurgus chemsaki (Timberlake, 1975) i c
 Pseudopanurgus citrinifrons (Viereck, 1903) i c g
 Pseudopanurgus citripes (Ashmead, 1890) i c g
 Pseudopanurgus clypeatus (Timberlake, 1975) i c
 Pseudopanurgus compactus Timberlake, 1973 i c g
 Pseudopanurgus compositarum Sm. i c g b
 Pseudopanurgus concinnus (Fox, 1894) i c g
 Pseudopanurgus congener (Timberlake, 1975) i c g
 Pseudopanurgus consors (Timberlake, 1975) i c g
 Pseudopanurgus crenulatus (Cockerell, 1905) i c g
 Pseudopanurgus creper (Timberlake, 1975) i c g
 Pseudopanurgus dakotensis (Timberlake, 1977) i c g
 Pseudopanurgus dawsoni Timberlake, 1964 i c g
 Pseudopanurgus dicksoni Timberlake, 1967 i c g
 Pseudopanurgus didirupa (Cockerell, 1908) i c g - grassland miner bee
 Pseudopanurgus diparilis (Timberlake, 1975) i c g
 Pseudopanurgus dreisbachi (Timberlake, 1975) i c
 Pseudopanurgus durangoensis (Timberlake, 1975) i c
 Pseudopanurgus elongatus (Friese, 1917) i c g
 Pseudopanurgus euphorbiae (Timberlake, 1975) i c
 Pseudopanurgus eurycephalus (Timberlake, 1975) i c g
 Pseudopanurgus expallidus (Swenk & Cockerell, 1907) i c g
 Pseudopanurgus fasciatus Timberlake, 1973 i c g
 Pseudopanurgus flavotinctus (Cockerell, 1898) i c g
 Pseudopanurgus fraterculus (Lacepède, 1802) i c g b
 Pseudopanurgus friesei Timberlake, 1973 i c g
 Pseudopanurgus fuliginosus Timberlake, 1973 i c g
 Pseudopanurgus fulvicornis Timberlake, 1973 i c g
 Pseudopanurgus fuscicornis Timberlake, 1973 i c g
 Pseudopanurgus fuscitarsis (Timberlake, 1975) i c g
 Pseudopanurgus globiceps (Timberlake, 1975) i c g
 Pseudopanurgus gracilis (Timberlake, 1975) i c
 Pseudopanurgus helianthi Mitchell, 1960 i c g
 Pseudopanurgus horizontalis (Swenk & Cockerell, 1907) i c g
 Pseudopanurgus humilis (Timberlake, 1975) i c
 Pseudopanurgus illinoiensis (Cresson, 1878) i c g - Illinois miner bee
 Pseudopanurgus illustris Timberlake, 1967 i c g
 Pseudopanurgus innuptus (Cockerell, 1896) i c g - unmarried miner bee
 Pseudopanurgus inornatus (Timberlake, 1975) i c g
 Pseudopanurgus irregularis (Cockerell, 1922) i c g
 Pseudopanurgus labrosiformis (Robertson, 1898) i c g
 Pseudopanurgus labrosus (Robertson, 1895) i c g
 Pseudopanurgus lateralis Timberlake, 1973 i c g
 Pseudopanurgus leucopterus (Cockerell, 1923) i c g
 Pseudopanurgus levis (Timberlake, 1975) i c g
 Pseudopanurgus leviventris (Timberlake, 1975) i c g
 Pseudopanurgus lopeziae (Timberlake, 1975) i c g
 Pseudopanurgus lugubris (Timberlake, 1975) i c g
 Pseudopanurgus lutzae (Cockerell, 1922) i c g
 Pseudopanurgus margaritensis (Fox, 1893) i c g
 Pseudopanurgus mexicanus (Cresson, 1878) i c g
 Pseudopanurgus mundus (Timberlake, 1975) i c
 Pseudopanurgus nanulus Timberlake, 1964 i c g
 Pseudopanurgus nebrascensis (Crawford, 1903) i c g
 Pseudopanurgus neomexicanus (Cockerell, 1898) i c g
 Pseudopanurgus nitens (Timberlake, 1975) i c g
 Pseudopanurgus nitescens (Cockerell, 1918) i c g
 Pseudopanurgus nubis (Cockerell, 1913) i c g
 Pseudopanurgus occiduus Timberlake, 1967 i c g
 Pseudopanurgus opacellus (Cockerell, 1949) i c g
 Pseudopanurgus opacicollis Timberlake, 1964 i c g
 Pseudopanurgus opaculus (Cockerell, 1922) i c g
 Pseudopanurgus ornatipes (Cresson, 1872) i c g - ornate miner bee
 Pseudopanurgus parvulus (Friese, 1917) i c g
 Pseudopanurgus parvus (Robertson, 1892) i c g b - small miner bee
 Pseudopanurgus pauper (Cresson, 1878) i c g - poor miner bee
 Pseudopanurgus pecki (Cockerell, 1937) i c g - Peck's miner bee
 Pseudopanurgus pectidellus Cockerell, 1904 i c g
 Pseudopanurgus pectiphilus (Cockerell, 1913) i c g
 Pseudopanurgus perarmatus Timberlake, 1967 i c g
 Pseudopanurgus perlaevis (Cockerell, 1896) i c g
 Pseudopanurgus pernitens (Cockerell, 1922) i c g
 Pseudopanurgus perpunctatus Timberlake, 1973 i c g
 Pseudopanurgus piercei (Crawford, 1903) i c g  - Pierce's miner bee
 Pseudopanurgus planatus (Cockerell, 1918) i c g
 Pseudopanurgus platycephalus (Ruz, 1990) i c g
 Pseudopanurgus pleuralis (Timberlake, 1975) i c g
 Pseudopanurgus porterae (Cockerell, 1900) i c
 Pseudopanurgus pueblanus (Timberlake, 1975) i c
 Pseudopanurgus pulchricornis (Cockerell, 1922) i c g
 Pseudopanurgus pumilis (Timberlake, 1975) i c g
 Pseudopanurgus readioi (Michener, 1952) i c g
 Pseudopanurgus renimaculatus (Cockerell, 1896) i c g - kidney-stained miner bee
 Pseudopanurgus rudbeckiae (Robertson, 1895) i c - rudbeckiae miner bee
 Pseudopanurgus rufosignatus Cockerell, 1949 i c g
 Pseudopanurgus rugosus (Robertson, 1895) i c
 Pseudopanurgus scaber (Fox, 1894) i c g
 Pseudopanurgus sculleni (Timberlake, 1975) i c g
 Pseudopanurgus semilevis Timberlake, 1973 i c g
 Pseudopanurgus setiger (Timberlake, 1977) i c g
 Pseudopanurgus simulans (Swenk & Cockerell, 1907) i c g
 Pseudopanurgus solidaginis (Robertson, 1893) i c g
 Pseudopanurgus stathamae Timberlake, 1967 i c g
 Pseudopanurgus stigmalis (Swenk & Cockerell, 1907) i c g
 Pseudopanurgus subglaber (Timberlake, 1975) i c g
 Pseudopanurgus sublevis (Timberlake, 1975) i c g
 Pseudopanurgus subopacus Timberlake, 1964 i c g
 Pseudopanurgus subrugosus Timberlake, 1973 i c g
 Pseudopanurgus succinctus (Timberlake, 1975) i c g
 Pseudopanurgus texanus Timberlake, 1973 i c g
 Pseudopanurgus tomentosus Timberlake, 1973 i c g
 Pseudopanurgus townsendi (Cockerell, 1897) i c
 Pseudopanurgus tridecis (Timberlake, 1975) i c g
 Pseudopanurgus trifasciatus Timberlake, 1973 i c g
 Pseudopanurgus trimaculatus Timberlake, 1973 i c g
 Pseudopanurgus tripogandrae (Timberlake, 1975) i c g
 Pseudopanurgus tuberatus Timberlake, 1973 i c g
 Pseudopanurgus velutinus Timberlake, 1973 i c g
 Pseudopanurgus ventralis (Timberlake, 1975) i c g
 Pseudopanurgus verticalis Timberlake, 1967 i c g
 Pseudopanurgus vicinus Timberlake, 1967 i c g
 Pseudopanurgus virginicus (Cockerell, 1907) i c g
 Pseudopanurgus ximenesiae (Cockerell, 1913) i c g
 Pseudopanurgus zamoranicus (Cockerell, 1949) i c g

Data sources: i = ITIS, c = Catalogue of Life, g = GBIF, b = Bugguide.net

References

Pseudopanurgus
Articles created by Qbugbot